The City Center Batavia  or TCC Batavia Towers is a complex of  three office towers located at Tanah Abang in Jakarta, Indonesia.

The City Center Tower 1 (City Center Annex Building) is the tallest among the towers, which 208 meters tall skyscraper. There are parking spaces, ATM's, restaurant, retail outlets and bank as facilities in the office complex.

See also
 List of tallest buildings in Jakarta
 List of tallest buildings in Indonesia

References 

Buildings and structures in Jakarta
Post-independence architecture of Indonesia
Skyscraper office buildings in Indonesia
2012 establishments in Indonesia